Ketab Sara Co. sometimes written as Ketabsara, is a global publishing house founded in December 1981, in Tehran, Iran. They have published various historical, social and cultural works of Iran. 

The publishing house founder and director Sadegh Samiei died in summer 2021.

Sources

 Ameri, Ali. "Globalizing African Children's Tribulation." In Iran Daily, January 27, 2008, p. 12.
 Birjandi, Fazeli. "Negahi be Khaterat-e Ardeshir-e Zahedi: Harfha-ye Yek Mahram-e Shah [A look Ardeshir Zahedi's Memoirs: Hearing from a Shah's Confident]." In Etemad 1355, March 15, 2007, p. 5.
 Mehran, Ali. "After Love: The Novel that Challenges Male Domination in Iran." In Iran News, December 19, 1998, p. 14.
 Motalebi, Dariush ed. Marja-e nashr-e Iran, 1389 [Iran’s Publishing Sourcebook]. Tehran: Khane-ye Ketab, 2010.
 Sabooni, Amin. "Beyond Darkness: Connecting the Disconnected." In Iran Daily, April 28, 2009, p. 7.
 Shojai-Sain, Ali, ed. Karnameh-ye Nashr-e Iran: Fehrest-e mosui-ye ketabha-ye montasher shodeh dar sal-e 1388 [Iran’s Publishing Record: A Thematic Inventory of the Books Published in the March 2009 to March 2010 period], vol. 1-3. Tehran: Khaneh-ye Ketab, 2010.
 Yousefpour, Reza. "Open Doors Opens Publishing Ethics Issues." In Iran Daily, May 29, 2005, p. 12.
 "Agahi-ye Tasis [Foundation Record]." In Ruzname-ye Rasmi [Iranian Official Journal] 10754, 17 Dey 1360 [7 January 1982], p. 15.
 "Ibn Arabi Award Presented." In Iran News, January 28, 2008, p. 13.
 "Solh o Amniat dar Ketab Sara [Peace and Security in Ketab Sara]." In Honar-e Zaman/Art of Age 1(3), August–September 2007, p. 27.

External links
 https://web.archive.org/web/20100605074911/http://www.katibe.ir/ provides references of the books published in Iran in the 1979-2009 period
 http://www.ketab.ir/ provides further information on the books published in Iran since 1979 (covers of the books published since 1996; and title pages, tables of content, and introduction of the books published since 2004)

Book publishing companies of Iran
Publishing companies established in 1981